The 2012–13 Czech Extraliga season is the 20th season of the Czech Extraliga since its creation after the breakup of Czechoslovakia and the Czechoslovak First Ice Hockey League in 1993.

Regular season

Standings

Statistics

Scoring leaders 
 
Updated as of the end of the regular season.
GP = Games played; G = Goals; A = Assists; Pts = Points; +/– = Plus/Minus; PIM = Penalty Minutes

Playoffs

Bracket 

The playoff bracket is not a fixed bracket. Like the intraconference bracket in the NHL, the matchups are adjusted in each successive round in order to place the top-ranked team against the bottom-ranked team.

Relegation

References

External links 
 
 Zlín - Plzeň 3:4 a.e.t., Game 7, iDNES.cz, retrieved 2013-04-21 (Czech)

2012-13
2
2012–13 in European ice hockey leagues